The Virgin Queen can refer to:

 Elizabeth I of England (1533–1603)
 The Virgin Queen (1923 film), a British silent historical film
 The Virgin Queen (1928 film), an American silent short filmed in Technicolor
 The Virgin Queen (1955 film), starring Bette Davis
 The Virgin Queen (TV serial), 2005, BBC

See also
 Virgin queen (disambiguation)

Nicknames
Nicknames in royalty